Eugene Timmons (died 13 May 1999) was an Irish Fianna Fáil politician. He attended St. Joseph's Secondary C.B.S. in Fairview. An office worker, Timmons was first elected to Dáil Éireann as a Fianna Fáil Teachta Dála (TD) for the Dublin North-East constituency at the 1961 general election, having previously stood at the 1948, 1951 and 1954 general elections, but not the 1957 general election. Timmons lost his Dáil seat at the 1965 general election but regained it at the 1969 general election, until losing it at the 1977 general election.

Timmons served two terms as Lord Mayor of Dublin from 1965 to 1967.

References

 

Year of birth missing
1999 deaths
Fianna Fáil TDs
Lord Mayors of Dublin
Members of the 17th Dáil
Members of the 19th Dáil
Members of the 20th Dáil
Politicians from County Dublin
People educated at St. Joseph's CBS, Fairview